The Pennsylvania State Senate is the upper house of the Pennsylvania General Assembly, the Pennsylvania state legislature. The State Senate meets in the State Capitol building in Harrisburg. Senators are elected for four-year terms, staggered every two years such that half of the seats are contested at each election. Even numbered seats and odd numbered seats are contested in separate election years. The president pro tempore of the Senate becomes the lieutenant governor of Pennsylvania in the event of the sitting lieutenant governor's removal, resignation or death. In this case the president pro tempore and lieutenant governor would be the same person. The Pennsylvania Senate has been meeting since 1791.

The president of the Senate is the lieutenant governor, who has no vote except to break a tie vote.

Qualifications

Senators must be at least 25 years of age. They must be a U.S. citizen and a PA resident four years, and a resident of that district one year prior to their election and must reside in that district during their term.

Senate leadership

President of the Senate: Austin Davis (D) 
President Pro Tempore of the Senate: Kim Ward (R)

Composition

Historical sessions

Current session
As of January 3, 2023:

Membership
The Senate is made up of 50 members who are elected by district. In 2012, a State Senate district had an average population of 254,047 residents.

List of current members

Standing committees

Past composition of the Senate

See also

 Pennsylvania State Senate information and voting records
 Pennsylvania House of Representatives
 President of the Pennsylvania Senate
 President pro tempore of the Pennsylvania Senate
 List of Pennsylvania state legislatures

References

Sources

External links

The Constitution of the Commonwealth of Pennsylvania
Pennsylvania State Senate
Pennsylvania State Senate information and voting records

Senate
State upper houses in the United States